Eydu Sohrab (also Romanized as ‘Eydū Sohrāb; also known as Deh-e Sohrāb) is a village in Dust Mohammad Rural District, in the Central District of Hirmand County, Sistan and Baluchestan Province, Iran. At the 2006 census, its population was 251, in 53 families.

References 

Populated places in Hirmand County